José Gabriel Manteigas is a Mozambican politician. He is a member of parliament with RENAMO from the Zambezia Province. In 2004, he was also a member of the Pan-African Parliament.

References

Year of birth missing (living people)
Living people
Members of the Pan-African Parliament from Mozambique
RENAMO politicians